Anthony Colinet (born January 15, 1976) is a retired French professional footballer who played midfielder. He played on the professional level in Ligue 1 for RC Lens and Ligue 2 for AS Beauvais Oise.

At the end of his career Colinet was playing for amateurs Gazélec Ajaccio.

References

1976 births
Living people
People from Fécamp
Association football midfielders
French footballers
Ligue 1 players
Ligue 2 players
USF Fécamp players
RC Lens players
ÉFC Fréjus Saint-Raphaël players
Gazélec Ajaccio players
AS Beauvais Oise players
SC Toulon players
Sportspeople from Seine-Maritime